Sam Spink (born 6 October 1999) is an English rugby union player. His regular position is centre.

References

External links
Wasps Profile
ESPN Profile
Ultimate Rugby Profile

1999 births
Living people
English rugby union players
Rugby union players from Kingston upon Thames
Wasps RFC players
Rugby union centres
Nottingham R.F.C. players
Western Force players